Errol James Livingston Taber (November 29, 1877 – February 6, 1947) was a justice of the Supreme Court of Nevada from 1935 until his death in 1947.

Born in Austin, Texas, he entered Santa Clara University in 1896 and attended Saint Paul Seminary in Saint Paul, Minnesota, and thereafter received his law degree from Columbia Law School in 1904.

Taber died in Reno, Nevada, at the age of 69.

References

1877 births
1947 deaths
Santa Clara University alumni
Saint Paul Seminary School of Divinity alumni
Columbia Law School alumni
Justices of the Nevada Supreme Court
Chief Justices of the Nevada Supreme Court